Roger Lin Maltbie (born June 30, 1951) is an American professional golfer and on-course analyst for NBC Sports.

Career
Maltbie was born in Modesto, California and grew up in San Jose. He attended James Lick High School where he was a teammate of former PGA Tour player Forrest Fezler. Maltbie attended San Jose City College (1970–1971), and then went on to San Jose State University; he was a member of the golf team at both institutions.

Maltbie turned professional in 1973, joined the PGA Tour in 1974, and played on the Tour full-time from 1975 to 1996. He won five official tour events between 1975 and 1985, including back-to-back wins in his first full year. After his win at the 1975 Pleasant Valley Classic, Maltbie left his $40,000 winner's check behind in a bar.

In his second year on tour, Maltbie won the inaugural Memorial Tournament by defeating Hale Irwin on the fourth hole of a sudden death playoff. On the playoff's third hole, an errant shot by Maltbie seemed headed for the gallery when it hit a stake causing the ball to bounce onto the green instead.

Maltbie had 55 top-10 finishes on the PGA Tour. In 1985, he won two tournaments, earned $360,554, and finished 8th on the money list. His best finish in a major was T4 at the 1987 Masters Tournament. Maltbie calls losing that tournament the biggest disappointment of his career.

Maltbie began play on the Senior PGA Tour after turning 50 in June 2001. His best finish at this level is a 20th at the 2003 Bayer Advantage Celebrity Pro-Am.

Since 1991, Maltbie has worked as an on-course reporter and analyst for NBC Sports. In this role, he has become well known as a jovial good-natured figure. His signature element is a "golf whisper", necessitated by the fact that Maltbie generally stands much closer to the green than other on-course reporters. During the 2002 and 2009 U.S. Opens, both contested at Bethpage State Park on Long Island, NBC ran features in which Maltbie spent a night camping out with several golfers while waiting in the infamous line to play Bethpage's Black Course, the first municipal course to host the U.S. Open.

Maltbie is a San Francisco 49ers fan and owns several Super Bowl rings given to him by former owner Edward J. DeBartolo, Jr. He and wife, Donna have two sons, Spencer and Parker.

Amateur wins (2)
1971 Northern California Championship
1972 California State Amateur Championship

Professional wins (12)

PGA Tour wins (5)

PGA Tour playoff record (2–1)

Other wins (4)
this list may be incomplete
1973 Northern California Open
1974 California State Open
1980 Magnolia State Classic
1984 Hassan II Golf Trophy

Senior wins (3)
2003 Liberty Mutual Legends of Golf - Raphael Division (with Gary Koch)
2008 Liberty Mutual Legends of Golf - Raphael Division (with Gary Koch)
2009 Liberty Mutual Legends of Golf - Raphael Division (with Gary Koch)

Results in major championships

CUT = missed the half-way cut
"T" indicates a tie for a place

Summary

Most consecutive cuts made – 16 (1977 Open Championship – 1987 PGA)
Longest streak of top-10s – 1 (twice)

Results in The Players Championship

CUT = missed the halfway cut
WD = withdrew
"T" indicates a tie for a place

See also 

 1974 PGA Tour Qualifying School graduates

References

External links

NBC Sports – Roger Maltbie

American male golfers
San Jose State Spartans men's golfers
PGA Tour golfers
PGA Tour Champions golfers
Golf writers and broadcasters
Golfers from California
San Jose City College alumni
Sportspeople from Modesto, California
Sportspeople from San Jose, California
People from Los Gatos, California
1951 births
Living people